Denis Matthew Lowney (June 1, 1863 – August 13, 1918) was an American prelate of the Roman Catholic Church. He served as auxiliary bishop of the Diocese of Providence in Rhode Island  from August 24, 1917 to October 23, 1917.

Biography

Early life 
Born in Castletown-Bar Haven in Ireland, Denis Lowney's family immigrated to the United States when he was a child.  Lowney was educated in Fall River, Massachusetts, and attended colleges in Saint-Laurent, Quebec, and Manhattan.  He completed his seminary studies at the Grand Seminary of Montreal in Montreal, Quebec.

Priesthood 
Lowney was ordained for the Diocese of Providence on December 17, 1887.  After his ordination, Lowney was assigned as assistant pastor at St. Mary's Parish in Providence.  In 1891, he moved to the Cathedral of Saints Peter and Paul Parish in Providence to serve as assistant pastor. Lowney was appointed chancellor of the diocese in 1894.  In 1903, he left his position as chancellor to become  rector of the cathedral. In 1905, he was installed as rector of St. Joseph’s Church in Pawtucket, Rhode Island.

Lowney also served as director of the St. Vincent de Paul Infant Asylum in Providence, which he worked to improve and develop.   Before becoming bishop, Lowney was named vicar general. He also served on the Bishop’s Council, as chair of the board of examiners for the clergy, chair of the school board, board chair of the Infirm Priests’ Fund, and director of the Eucharist League.

Auxiliary Bishop of Providence 
On August 24, 1917, Lowney was named titular bishop of Hadrianopolis in Honoraide and auxiliary bishop of the Diocese of Providence.  He was consecrated on October 23, 1917 by Bishop Thomas Beaven . Dennis Lowney died in Providence on August 13, 1918, after less than three months in  office.

References

External links 
Official site of the Holy See

Episcopal succession

20th-century Roman Catholic bishops in the United States
1856 births
1917 deaths
Clergy from Providence, Rhode Island
Roman Catholic Diocese of Providence
Irish emigrants to the United States (before 1923)